Justin Wayne Tkatchenko is a businessman, media personality and a Papua New Guinean politician.

Biography
Originally from Melbourne, Australia of Ukrainian descent, Tkatchenko obtained a brief professional horticulture training after his secondary education. He was then employed as a curator at the botanical gardens of the district of Port Moresby, the national capital of Papua New Guinea. In 1997 he was appointed a senior official in the District Administration. In 1999 he bought a small gardening business, where he grew fruit in the years that followed. He also became famous as the presenter of a gardening television show, "The Happy Gardener". In 1997 he was awarded the British Empire Medal for services rendered "to the orchid industry and tropical gardening".

Tkatchenko was naturalized as a Papua New Guinea citizen in 2006, and ran unsuccessfully as a candidate in the 2007 parliamentary elections: He was defeated by outgoing MP Dame Carol Kidu in the constituency of Port Moresby-South. After Dame Carol's political retirement, Tkatchenko won this constituency in the 2012 elections and entered the National Parliament as a member of Powes Parkop's Social Democratic Party. He was then made Minister of Sports in Peter O'Neill's coalition government, and became a member of O'Neill's People's National Congress party. Beginning in April 2016, he also had ministerial responsibility for the Asia-Pacific Economic Cooperation (APEC) Summit in 2018 in Papua New Guinea. Re-elected MP in the 2017 elections, he retains responsibility for the APEC summit, and was also made Minister of Land and Land Planning, while also being replaced as Minister of Sports. In 2018, Queen Elizabeth II made him commander of the Order of the British Empire.

The O'Neill government lost Parliament's confidence in May 2019. Tkatchenko left the People's National Congress, becoming a member of the Social Democratic Party again in support of new Prime Minister James Marape, who appointed him Minister of Housing and Urban Development. After the 2022 parliamentary elections, Tkatchenko was promoted to Foreign Minister. A few days later, he publicly mentioned Papua New Guinea's wish to sign a military and security cooperation treaty with Australia, in response to the similar treaty signed by the Solomon Islands and China in March 2022. Tkatchenko is again also Minister of Sports.

Footnotes

Living people
Members of the National Parliament of Papua New Guinea
Government ministers of Papua New Guinea
Social Democratic Party (Papua New Guinea) politicians
Year of birth missing (living people)